Bruce Ernest Howard (born March 23, 1943) is an American former Major League Baseball pitcher with the Chicago White Sox, Baltimore Orioles and Washington Senators between 1963 and 1968. A native of Salisbury, Maryland, he attended Villanova University. His son, David Howard, also played in the major leagues.

He was traded along with Don Buford and Roger Nelson from the White Sox to the Orioles for Luis Aparicio, Russ Snyder and John Matias on November 29, 1967. He went 0–2 with a 3.77 earned run average (ERA) in 31 innings with the Orioles before being dealt to the Senators for Fred Valentine before the trade deadline on June 15, 1968.

In a six-season career, Howard posted a 26–31 record with 349 strikeouts and a 3.18 ERA in 120 appearances, including seven complete games, four shutouts, one save, and  innings of work.

See also
List of second-generation Major League Baseball players

References

External links
, or Retrosheet, or Pura Pelota (Venezuelan Winter League)

1943 births
Living people
Baltimore Orioles players
Baseball players from Maryland
Buffalo Bisons (minor league) players
Chicago White Sox players
Clinton C-Sox players
Eugene Emeralds players
Florida Instructional League White Sox players
Indianapolis Indians players
Lynchburg White Sox players
Major League Baseball pitchers
Navegantes del Magallanes players
American expatriate baseball players in Venezuela
People from Salisbury, Maryland
Tucson Toros players
Villanova University alumni
Villanova Wildcats baseball players
Washington Senators (1961–1971) players